Swartzia macrophylla is a species of legume in the family Fabaceae. It is found only in Colombia.

References

macrophylla
Data deficient plants
Endemic flora of Colombia
Taxonomy articles created by Polbot